Siva (also spelt Shiva) is a 1989 Indian Telugu-language crime action film written and directed by Ram Gopal Varma in his directorial debut. Produced by Akkineni Venkat and Yarlagadda Surendra under their banners of Annapurna Studios and SS Creations, Siva stars Nagarjuna, Amala, and Raghuvaran. The film's basic plot, adapted from The Way of the Dragon (1972), revolves around the conflict between college student-turned-gangster Siva and Bhavani, a reputed crime boss mentored by the politician Machiraju. Siva explores the concepts of student exploitation by anti-social elements and the impact of crowd psychology.

Varma's script was based on his experiences as a student at Siddhartha Engineering College in Vijayawada. Tanikella Bharani wrote the dialogue. Ilaiyaraaja composed Siva soundtrack and score, and S. Gopala Reddy was its cinematographer. Thota Tharani and Sattibabu were the film's art director and editor, respectively. Its principal photography began on 16 February 1989, and was completed in 55 working days. Except for three days of shooting in Madras (now Chennai), Siva was filmed in Andhra Pradesh.

Produced on a budget of 75 lakh, Siva was released on 5 October 1989 to critical acclaim, primarily for its technology and sound design. Although Venkat and Surendra expected the film to have average earnings, it was commercially successful and went on to become the highest-grossing film of Telugu film industry; Siva completed a 100-day run in 22 centres and a 175-day run in five centres. It was featured in the Indian Panorama mainstream section of the 13th IFFI, held on 19 January 1990. In addition to the Filmfare Award for Best Film – Telugu, Siva won three Nandi Awards: Best Director (Varma), Best First Film of a Director, and Best Dialogue Writer (Bharani). A documentary titled Exploring Shiva after 25 Years was released on the film's silver anniversary; it is the first documentary about a Telugu film.

Siva, which attained cult status, is considered Nagarjuna's breakthrough film. It is credited with the introduction of steadicam and new sound recording techniques in Telugu cinema, encouraging filmmakers to explore a variety of themes and make experimental films. For the April 2013 centennial of Indian cinema, News18 included Siva on its list of 100 greatest Indian films of all time. Its Tamil-dubbed version, Udhayam, was also successful. Varma remade the film twice in Hindi with the same title. The first, featuring Nagarjuna and Amala reprising their roles, performed well at the box office, but the second did not.

Plot 
Siva is a student, who arrives at Vijayawada from a nearby town to pursue his education. He lives with his brother Sarath's family and enrolls in the VAS College of Arts and Sciences. Although Sarath and his daughter Keerthi get along well with Siva, his wife considers him a financial burden. Siva befriends a group of students and falls in love with Asha, the sister of the honest Inspector Venkat. The college's (unopposed) students' union president, J. Durga Rao (known as J. D), is the lowest rung on a gang ladder reaching from the gangster Ganesh to a crime boss named Bhavani.

Bhavani uses the network to support his mentor Machiraju, a politician. Although J. D. is arrested many times, Bhavani continues to bail him out. When J.D teases Asha on campus, Siva attacks him with a bicycle chain, which develops a rivalry between him and Ganesh. The incident encourages Siva's friends to ask him to stand for the students' union presidency, but he wants them to nominate Naresh (one of the group members) instead. Ganesh's attempts to pacify Siva fail and Bhavani learns about him. He considers Siva as a potential replacement for J. D, whose weakness annoys him. Naresh is fatally assaulted by J. D. and Bhavani's henchmen and is taken to hospital. Siva retaliates, infuriating Bhavani. When Siva's friends attend a wedding, they are attacked by Ganesh and others. One of Siva's friends, Malli, is murdered, and Siva swears vengeance.

Sensing a risk to Sarath's family after an attempt on Keerthi's life, Siva leaves their house and moves into his friend Chinna's hostel. He agrees to contest the students' union presidential election. Bhavani cheats labour union leader Krishna Reddy, who changes his allegiance to Siva. Around this time, Asha and Siva marry. Bhavani begins attacking and murdering Siva's close aides, and Siva ensures that Sarath relocates to Visakhapatnam as a part of his job. Siva attacks Bhavani's henchmen and helps Venkat arrest Ganesh. Machiraju sees Siva as a potential replacement for Bhavani and stops supporting the latter. Bhavani learns about Siva's relationship with Sarath and kidnaps Keerthi. Ganesh appears in court, and an arrest warrant is issued for Bhavani.

Insulted and humiliated, Bhavani kills Keerthi and Machiraju. Siva hears about Keerthi's death and sets to avenge her. While Bhavani comes out of Machiraju's house after killing him, Siva spots him, and a chase ensues. Siva and Bhavani duel at a shopping complex terrace. After Bhavani gets heavily injured by Siva, he decides to commit suicide. Siva tries to stop him, but is unsuccessful. Venkat and Asha reach the mall and witness Bhavani's corpse among the crowd. Siva walks down the stairs and meets them up in dismay.

Cast 

 Nagarjuna as Siva
 Amala as Asha
 Raghuvaran as Bhavani
 Murali Mohan as Sarath
 Kota Srinivasa Rao as Machiraju
 Gollapudi Maruti Rao as Viswanadham
 Sai Chand as Venkat
 Tanikella Bharani as Nanaji
 Subhalekha Sudhakar as "Malli" Mallick
 Chakravarthy as J. Durga Rao (J. D.)
 Jithendra as Chinna
 Ramjagan as Naresh
 Viswanath as Ganesh
 Sushma as Keerthi
 Nirmalamma as Malli's mother
 Brahmaji as Bhavani's henchman
 Uttej as Yadagiri
 Bhanu Prakash as the college principal
 Puri Jagannadh (special appearance in the song "Botany")

Production

Development 
After he graduated with a degree in civil engineering from Siddhartha Engineering College in Vijayawada, Ram Gopal Varma opened a video-rental shop in Ameerpet. Noting his son's interest in films, Penmatsa Krishnamraju (a former sound recordist for Annapurna Studios) helped Varma join the teams of Collector Gari Abbai (1987) and Rao Gari Illu (1988) as an assistant director. Varma befriended actor Nagarjuna, and filmmakers Akkineni Venkat and Yarlagadda Surendra. He presented his script for Raathri to them. When Nagarjuna rejected it, Varma presented another script based on his life as a student in Vijayawada. He earlier narrated this script to filmmaker K. Raghavendra Rao who suggested few changes because of its serious tone. Varma watched Rao's Kaliyuga Pandavulu (1986) and backed out after understanding Rao's point of view.

When Rao Gari Illu was nearly completed, Varma asked co-director Siva Nageswara Rao to join him. He approached Tanikella Bharani to write the dialogues after observing his work in Ladies Tailor (1985) and Sri Kanaka Mahalakshmi Recording Dance Troupe (1987). Bharani found the plot (as described by Varma) similar to those of K. S. R. Das' films. Varma rejected Bharani's comic version, and asked to rewrite it as a crime drama. Although Bharani's usual fee was 25,000, he received 35,000 for Siva. Gunasekhar and Teja, who later pursued career as filmmakers, joined the film's crew as assistant directors.

Venkat and Surendra produced Siva under their banners of Annapurna Studios and SS Creations, respectively. The production began in February 1989. Varma wanted M. M. Keeravani to compose the film's soundtrack and score, since Keeravani had assisted K. Chakravarthy on Rao Gari Illu. As both were inexperienced, Keeravani suggested that Varma choose a more seasoned technician and Ilaiyaraaja was signed instead. S. Gopala Reddy, Thota Tharani and Sattibabu were the film's director of photography, art director and editor, respectively. Gopala Reddy was inspired by Gordon Willis' work in the crime film, The Godfather (1972).

Casting 
Siva is Nagarjuna's 17th film as an actor. Varma found him the only actor who could understand his perspective. Nagarjuna and Varma had discussed astronomy and realised that they shared similar sensibilities. That, and Varma's passion for and dedication to films, prompted Nagarjuna to work with him. Amala, who worked with Nagarjuna in Prema Yuddham (1990), was chosen as the female lead. Siva was the first film in her career where the script was explained shot by shot. When Varma approached Rohini to dub Amala's portions, she agreed to dub for Amala only after watching about three reels of footage.

Varma chose Raghuvaran to play the local crime boss, Bhavani. Varma wanted him to underplay the character, which was based on real life. Before accepting the role, Raghuvaran studied the mannerisms and lifestyles of mob leaders and criminals in Mumbai for 20 days. Varma wanted to name the characters played by Nagarjuna and Raghuvaran as Bhavani and Siva respectively. At Nagarjuna's request, he reversed the names. Varma chose newcomers Chakravarthy, Jithendra, and Ramjagan to play J. D., Chinna, and Naresh after auditioning them at Annapurna Studios. Uttej, one of Varma's assistant directors, played a comic role of a server in the college canteen. He recommended Varma to cast Sushma for Keerthi's role.

P. Sai Kumar was initially supposed to play J. D., but the role went to Chakravarthy. Varma met the latter on the film's sets and asked him to perform a scene of his choice. Despite an unsuccessful screen test, Varma selected Chakravarthy after a meeting on the next day after observing the depth in his expression. Seasoned actors such as Murali Mohan, Gollapudi Maruti Rao, Kota Srinivasa Rao, Subhalekha Sudhakar, and Saichand played supporting roles. Bharani agreed to play Bhavani's assistant, Nanaji, at Varma's insistence. Producer Akkineni Venkat made a cameo appearance as one of Bhavani's clients, and Siva Nageswara Rao dubbed his portion. Brahmaji was cast as Bhavani's henchman.

Filming 

Varma read about steadicam in American Cinematographer, and enquired about the possibility of a similar camera in India. After learning that steadicam was available in Chennai for four years and was already obsolete, Varma decided to use it despite Gopala Reddy's apprehension. Varma chose Rasool Ellore over Rajiv Menon and Deenpal to assist Gopala Reddy with the steadicam. Principal photography began on 16 February 1989, and wrapped in 55 working days. Except for three days in Chennai, the film was shot in Andhra Pradesh.

The scenes of the protagonist's college life were filmed at Keyes High school, near Secunderabad Junction railway station. A school wall was demolished, and a gate was repaired for the film's opening scene. Raghuvaran was carried away during the shoot of few action sequences and slapped Brahmaji for nearly six times in a row. To avoid such issues in the case of murder scenes, Varma decided to complete a few of them by using plain close-ups of the victims.

Sudhakar's murder scene was filmed near Keesara in Ranga Reddy district. Gopala Reddy and Ellore placed a camera in a bag and ran behind him for a shaky effect. In the cycle-chain scene in which Siva uses a cycle chain to fight with J. D., the hand pulling the chain was Ellore's; in the next shot, Nagarjuna is shown holding the chain. The scene in which Naresh is killed near his home was filmed in the streets of Vengala Rao Nagar. The cycle chase scenes were filmed in Somajiguda and the slums behind Yashoda Hospitals. The bus chase scene was shot in Yusufguda. The film's climax was filmed at the Swapnalok complex in Secunderabad, and Bhavani's suicide was filmed on a set at Venus Studios in Chennai.

Several romantic scenes with Nagarjuna and Amala were initially filmed at Ushakiron Movies in Secunderabad. Dissatisfied with the results, Varma reshot them at the Osman Ali House. Mugur Sundar choreographed the songs, and "Anando Brahma" was filmed at the Borra Caves in Visakhapatnam. The film crew had to crawl into the caves, making Siva the first Telugu film shot in its interiors. The remaining songs were filmed on sets at Annapurna Studios. Srinivasa Rao filmed his scenes in one day. The fights, choreographed by Varma, featured hand-to-hand combat and attacks with hooks as he was trained in kickboxing.

Themes and influences 

Siva explores the exploitation of students by anti-social elements against a mafia backdrop and the impact on them of crowd psychology. It also focuses on politics and betrayal in the scene where Bhavani murders Machiraju and his enemy Viswanadham. As a student, Varma observed and participated in gang wars and student politics besides analysing the impact of a gangster's lifestyle and body language on students. Those experiences inspired him to begin writing Siva.

Most of the characters, including Bhavani, were inspired by real life. Bhavani was based on Radha, an actual crime boss with a reputation for violence in Vijayawada; Bhavani, like Radha, is also a woman's name. Siva's character was comparatively fictitious whom Varma considered an "ideal person" making the society "too dramatic". Siva was partially based on Varma's friend, Golla Ravi, who lived in Punjagutta. Assistant director Krishna Vamsi found the film's story similar to Arjun (1985). Varma said that Arjun was an inspiration for Siva, since Sunny Deol title character in Arjun was a hero who "does not bend to forces larger than himself". Apart from Arjun, Varma was also inspired by Ardh Satya (1983) and Kaal Chakra (1988).

The basic plot of The Way of the Dragon (1972) was adapted by Varma for Siva. In The Way of the Dragon, Tang Lung (Bruce Lee) comes from Hong Kong to work in a Chinese restaurant in Rome and fights local gangsters who try to intimidate the owners; this leads to a rivalry with a crime boss (Chuck Norris). In Siva, Nagarjuna comes from a nearby town to Vijayawada to further his education, fights gangsters and develops a rivalry with Raghuvaran. While Lee and Norris fight at the Colosseum at the climax of The Way of the Dragon, Nagarjuna and Raghuvaran duel on a building terrace in Siva.

In addition to The Way of the Dragon, Varma adapted scenes from a number of other films. Malli's mother slapping a police inspector for failing to save him was inspired by Steven Spielberg's Jaws (1975), and the cycle chase scene was based on a similar scene in Arjun. A scene in which goons demand donations to build a temple for Ganesha was from Kaal Chakra. Although Varma wanted to film a fight between Nagarjuna and Chakravarthy during a football match (based on a similar scene in 1978's Damien: Omen II), Venkat was indifferent to the idea.

Music 

The five-song soundtrack album and background score of Siva were composed by Ilaiyaraaja, with Veturi Sundararama Murthy writing the lyrics of "Anando Brahma", "Enniyallo", and "Kiss Me Hello". Sirivennela Seetharama Sastry wrote the lyrics for the remaining two songs: "Botany" and "Sarasalu". S. P. Balasubrahmanyam, S. Janaki, K. S. Chithra, and Mano were the singers. Due to a strike in Madras, Ilaiyaraaja and Varma completed the background score in Mumbai. The producers suggested Varma to use stock tunes instead for the score. Nagarjuna noticed this and asked them to provide what Varma asked for, and offered to pay the additional expenses incurred if any. For an action scene, Ilaiyaraaja used moving string music; when Varma asked why, he answered: "They have come here to study and they are fighting. So I just felt sad for them".

Varma was impressed with Deepan Chatterjee's work in Sindhoora Puvvu (1988) and recruited him as Siva sound designer. Ismail Darbar, who later composed the music for Hum Dil De Chuke Sanam (1999) and Devdas (2002), worked with Ilaiyaraaja on Siva as a violinist. The soundtrack was successful, and Chatterjee's sound design was critically acclaimed. Varma dedicated the background score of his Rowdy (2014), composed by Sai Karthik, to Ilaiyaraaja. Adapting the background score of the cycle-chase scene in Rowdy, Varma said that his main interest was "to bring back this composition to express the great idea of the genius [Ilaiyaraaja's] 1989 soundtrack (of Siva) to 2014".

Release 
Siva was produced on a budget of 75 lakh. Venkat and Surendra retained the distribution rights for Nizam, Vishakhapatnam and the East and West Godavari regions. The film was released on 5 October 1989, It was featured in the Indian Panorama mainstream section of the 13th International Film Festival of India, held on 19 January 1990 at the Empire Theatre in Kolkata. The Tamil remake rights to Siva were initially sold for 100,000. After the film's release, Venkat and Surendra dubbed it into Tamil as Udhayam and sold its distribution rights for 85 lakh. It was released on 12 January 1990 in 24 centres.

Reception 
The film received was praised for its usage of technology and sound design. The distributors were concerned about the film's violence, saying that it would alienate women and families, whom the film industry believed were the majority of the audience. Although Venkat and Surendra expected that the film would have average earnings, Siva was a commercial success and earned 1 crore in the Nizam region alone (a first in Telugu cinema). In addition to 50,000, Varma received five percent of Siva profits. The film had a 100-day run in 22 centres and a 175-day run in five centres. The Tamil version Udhayam was commercially successful and earned more than 2 crore. Nagarjuna's father Akkineni Nageswara Rao advised Varma to place an advertisement thanking the audience for the film's success. Varma opposed it, believing that a film's success should be credited to the production team and its failure attributed to the director. When Varma's second film, Kshana Kshanam (1991) under-performed at the box office, Siva success was considered accidental. For the April 2013 centennial of Indian cinema News18 included Siva on its list of 100 greatest Indian films of all time, calling it a "completely new take on student politics and the ideologies driving it" and saying that the film's ideas "found a reflection in many university elections during a later stage".

Awards

Remakes 
Siva was remade by Varma in Hindi as Shiva in 1990, and was Nagarjuna's acting debut in Hindi cinema. It was the last Hindi film with Amala in a lead role. Minor changes were made to the remake's cast and crew. All the songs in the Telugu version were used unchanged except for "Botany", which was reshot at Acharya N. G. Ranga Agricultural University in Rajendranagar. Telugu filmmaker Puri Jagannadh was cast as one of Nagarjuna's friends in the remake. Jagannadh wanted to assist Varma and approached him for an opportunity. Varma insisted Jagannadh to act and he obliged, feeling that this experience would teach him something. Produced in association with Atluri Purnachandra Rao on a budget of 1.15 crore, Shiva was released on 7 December 1990 and was successful in Mumbai and Kolkata.

During the production of James (2005), Varma planned to remake Siva. The second remake, also entitled Shiva, featured Mohit Ahlawat and Priyanka Kothari as the characters played by Nagarjuna and Amala in the original. Unlike Siva, the protagonist in the second remake is an honest man who joins the Mumbai Police as a new recruit; the cycle-chain scene and Raghuvaran's character were omitted. Shiva received negative reviews; Sukanya Verma of Rediff.com wrote that the film "dare[d] to ridiculously rest on the incapable shoulders of a non-acting cast", and nastiness was "defined as a scowling ogre". Director Riingo Banerjee acknowledged Siva as a source of inspiration for his 2006 Bengali film Kranti.

Sequel 
In September 2020 Nagarjuna said that a sequel to Siva would be a viable alternative to a digitised version, and proposed a film about Siva, Asha, and their two sons. Advising Varma to develop a script, he asked the director to cast Amala, Naga Chaitanya and Akhil Akkineni. The sequel would reportedly be produced by Annapurna Studios.

Aftermath

Digitisation 
In September 2014, Siva was digitally remastered for theatrical release. Supriya Yarlagadda of Annapurna Studios said that the decision to remaster and digitise was made after observing the challenges in storing and preserving old film prints. The process (carried out in Mumbai) took a year, and the film's colour and sound quality were enhanced to meet current standards. A silver jubilee event was held on 7 October 2014 in Hyderabad, where Nagarjuna announced that Siva digitised version would be released on 17 October 2014 on nearly 100 screens. In April 2015, Varma told Indo-Asian News Service that the digitised release was postponed until 15 May because of restoration delays.

Documentary 
During the digitisation of Shiva, Varma said that he would release a documentary on the making of the film entitled Exploring Shiva after 25 Years. The first documentary based on a Telugu film, it provided a "holistic view of the film" and featured interviews with the cast and crew and segments on its sound and filming locations. The documentary was released on 5 October 2014, coinciding with Siva silver anniversary.

Legacy

Influence on film personalities 

Siva, which attained cult status in Telugu cinema, is one of the first Telugu films produced after the migration of Telugu film industry from Madras to Hyderabad to feature characters speaking the Telangana dialect. The film made Nagarjuna a superstar in Telugu cinema; it changed his career, and earned him a reputation for encouraging new directors. Nagarjuna considered Siva a milestone in his personal life as well since he and Amala, who were in a relationship during the film's shoot, decided to marry after its completion.

According to filmmaker V. V. Vinayak and writer Pulagam Chinnarayana, Siva divided Telugu cinema into two eras: before and after the film. With Siva, Varma was credited with the introduction of steadicams and new sound recording techniques in Telugu films. Within a year of the film's release, more than ten steadicams were imported into India. Siva attracted the young audience during its theatrical run, and its success encouraged filmmakers to explore a variety of themes and make experimental Telugu films.

Bharani broke through as an actor and dialogue writer with the film. Chakravarthy, Jithendra and Ramjagan achieved success with Siva, and the former two adapted J. D. and Chinna as screen names. Kannada actor and filmmaker Upendra reworked the narrative of Om (1995) when he found the previous version similar to Siva. Telugu filmmaker S. S. Rajamouli understood the importance of heightening tension in action sequences, and the impact created by proper use of sound after watching Siva. Srinu Vaitla, Sudheer Varma, and Praveen Sri were inspired by Siva to pursue careers as directors; Sri assisted Ram Gopal Varma before he made his directorial debut with Gaayam 2 (2010). Music director Munna Kasi was inspired by Ilaiyaraaja's work in Siva, and wanted to work with Varma after he graduated. On the rise of antisocial-element-based scripts in Tamil cinema, trade analyst Sreedhar Pillai said in May 2002 that Siva Tamil-dubbed version (Udhayam) was the "forerunner" of city-based crime films.

Tamil actor Ganesh Venkatraman was "mesmerised" as a child by Siva, admiring Nagarjuna and carrying a cycle chain in his schoolbag. About the impact of Baahubali: The Beginning (2015) on Indian cinema, Rana Daggubati said that regional films can gain national acceptance for their content and cited the success of Siva and Roja (1992) as examples. In March 2016, Karthi said that he admired Nagarjuna after seeing Udhayam its Tamil dubbed version and Idhayathai Thirudathe (1989) and found working with him in Oopiri (2016) "a great chance to know him."

In popular culture 
The cycle-chain scene became popular, with people telling Varma that they broke a cycle chain after seeing Siva; the director called them the "ultimate example of how imagination can take over and become a reality in time". As of 2014, the chain used in the film is owned by Chakravarthy. Film-poster designers Anil and Bhanu said that posters should be designed to make a subconscious impact on the viewer, citing the title logo of Siva (with Nagarjuna and the cycle chain) as an example. Inspired by Varma's work in Siva, Rajamouli composed the action sequence during the intermission of his directorial debut Student No. 1 (2002), and followed the shot division of the cycle-chain scene for the same.

Chakravarthy agreed to play the antagonist in Naga Chaitanya's acting debut, Josh (2009), and said that its makers are "trying to get JD of Shiva who actually ran away mid way from college". Bangalore Mirror and other reviewers noted similarities between Josh and Siva, which Chaitanya called a "coincidence". Chaitanya's films, Bezawada (2011)—produced by Varma—and Autonagar Surya (2014), were noted for similarities to Siva. Siva was parodied in several films such as Lakshmi (2006), Oosaravelli (2011), Katha Screenplay Darsakatvam Appalaraju (2011) (also directed by Varma), and Sudigadu (2012).

Amala listed Siva with Pushpaka Vimana (1987), Vedham Pudhithu (1987), Agni Natchathiram (1988), and Karpoora Mullai (1991) as her most memorable films. Geethika Chandrahasan Sudip of The Hindu listed Siva for the letter S in the July 2015 "ABCD of Telugu cinema". In August 2015, Pooja Darade of The Times of India included the film on her list of "Telugu movies one must watch before dying". Fahad Usmani of The Hindu compared Siva to Mother India (1957), Sholay (1975), Mr. India (1987), Agneepath (1990), and Ghayal (1990), noting that their antagonists became more popular than their heroes.

Notes

References

Bibliography

External links 
 

1980s action drama films
1980s crime action films
1980s Telugu-language films
1989 crime drama films
1989 directorial debut films
1989 films
Films directed by Ram Gopal Varma
Films scored by Ilaiyaraaja
Films set in Hyderabad, India
Films set in Vijayawada
Films shot in Vijayawada
Indian action drama films
Indian crime action films
Indian crime drama films
Telugu films remade in other languages